Laurie Stephenson (18 October 1939 – 24 October 2009) was an  Australian rules footballer who played with St Kilda in the Victorian Football League (VFL).

Notes

External links 

1939 births
2009 deaths
Australian rules footballers from Victoria (Australia)
St Kilda Football Club players
Sale Football Club players